John Henry Hollison (May 3, 1870 in Chicago – August 19, 1969 in Chicago) was a professional baseball player who was a pitcher in the major leagues in 1892. He played in one game for the Chicago Colts. At the time of his death, he was the oldest living former major league player.

External links

1870 births
1969 deaths
19th-century baseball players
Major League Baseball pitchers
Chicago Colts players
Chicago Whitings players
Baseball players from Chicago